Twenty Four Seven Tour  (also known as the Twenty Four Seven Millennium Tour and 24/7 World Tour) is the tenth concert tour by singer Tina Turner. The tour promoted her final studio album Twenty Four Seven (1999). It was reported that the tour grossed US$122.5 million from 108 shows with an attendance of 2.4 million spectators. According to Pollstar, the tour also became that year's highest-grossing tour in North America with $80.2 million in earnings. At that time, Turner's outing was the fifth highest grossing tour ever in North America. The tour was sponsored by E*Trade.

Though billed as her final outing, Turner would return to touring in 2008 with her anniversary tour.

Background 
After her record-breaking 1996 world tour, Turner decided to take a longer break between albums and tours. Initially, Turner planned an elaborate co-headlining tour with Elton John. The two performed a duet of Turner's hit "Proud Mary" and John's "The Bitch is Back" on the VH1 special, "Divas Live '99". During rehearsals, Turner felt unease with the music and stopped everyone from playing and then instructed John on how to play the song.

The tour plans were cancelled and Turner scrapped her initial plans for a greatest hits collection deciding to record her final studio album. Along the way, Turner also performed the Super Bowl XXXIV pre-show ceremonies.

To introduce the tour, Turner stated: It's a play. It's an act. For the moment, it's a small movie, so to speak. That's why I like all of the stuff and the action and the playoff between me and the girls. It's life on that stage for that two hours.

Development 
As mentioned above, the tour initially was set to promote her latest studio album. During promotion, Turner acknowledge the tour as her final one as she enters pseudo-retirement. She comments:
I've been performing for 44 years; I really should hang up my dancing shoes. I can't keep up with Janet Jackson. I'm not a diva like Diana Ross. I'm rock 'n' roll, but I'm happy I can do it one more time, so people can remember me at my best."

The album played a prominent role in the tour as Turner rehearsed "Whatever You Need", "When the Heartache is Over", "Talk to My Heart", "Falling", "Don't Leave Me This Way" (which was to be included in a ballads medley with "Two People" and two other unknown songs) and "Twenty Four Seven". When Turner decided to do a retrospective of her career, she included her first hit, "A Fool in Love", the first time Turner performed the song live since the 1970s. Turner also rehearsed "Ooh Poo Pah Do" but replaced with "Get Back". Additionally, she included some of her favorite R&B hits including, "Hold On, I'm A Comin'" and "I Heard It Through the Grapevine".

For her final outing, Turner wanted a stage that was sleek and modern. Her original concepts included the framing of an "apartment building" that had cabins and access ramps. Also included were risers with visible staircases and front drop for the musicians. Fisher, also wanted to create a volcano effect with the staging, have it split into two sets. This inner stage included a video screen and a ramp leading to an upstage platform. There was an additional ramp that lead downstage. The main feature of the stage was the "cantilever arm". A 2' wide, 60' long platform that extended Turner into the audience. Initially, Turner did not want the arm as the same concept was used for her 1990 European tour and she did not want to repeat herself. However, after seeing video animations, Turner wanted the arm included. For stadium shows, a roof for the stage was added along with additional video screens. The arm was extended an additional 20 feet. It took at least seven hours to construct the stage.

The stage was constructed by McLaren Engineering Group.

Opening act 
Lionel Richie (North America [Leg 1] & UK)
John Fogerty (Europe [select dates]).
Janice Robinson (North America [Leg 1])
Joe Cocker (Europe [select dates] & North America [Leg 2])

Set list 
The following set list is from the July 16 show in London. It is not intended to represent all other dates throughout the tour.

"I Want to Take You Higher"
"Absolutely Nothing's Changed"
"A Fool in Love"
"Acid Queen"
"River Deep – Mountain High"
"We Don't Need Another Hero (Thunderdome)"
"Better Be Good to Me"
"Private Dancer"
"Let's Stay Together"
"What's Love Got to Do with It"
"When the Heartache Is Over"
"Baby I'm a Star" (Interlude)
"Help!"
"Whatever You Need"
"(Sittin' On) The Dock of the Bay" / "Try a Little Tenderness" (with John Miles)
"I Heard It Through the Grapevine"
"Addicted To Love"
"The Best"
"Proud Mary"
Encore
"Nutbush City Limits"
"Twenty Four Seven"

Tour dates

Cancelled shows

Box office score data

Critical reception 
Josh L. Dickey (Spartanburg Herald Journal) praised the tour, stating, "'In fact, the only low points came during Turner's protracted absences for outfit changes, when the backing crew was forced to carry the show. Minus Turner's soaring vocals—which cut sharply though the Target Center's infamously muddy acoustic chamber—the band seemed awkward and cursory.

Mark Brown (Rocky Mountain News) gave the performance at the Pepsi Center an "A", citing "From minute one, Turner bursts onto the stage with energy and finesse that only the Queen will process. Belting out her memorable hits, Turner proves it doesn't take media trickery to have success. She may be rolling down the river but Turner is creating an untouchable path. "

Martine Bury (VIBE) praised Turner's performance at the Allstate Arena, "From her signature rendition of Creedence Clearwater Revival's 'Proud Mary' to the way she heats up dance floors with her most recent single, 'When the Heartache is Over' that sultry, gravelly voice tells ardent stories like no other."

Broadcasts and recordings 

The opening night of the tour at the Target Center in Minneapolis, Minnesota, aired live on VH1's Opening Night Live on March 23, 2000. The concert at the Sopot Hippodrom aired on TVP1 on August 15, 2000. An additional television broadcast aired on BBC Three. The concert footage was filmed at the Oakland Arena performance on May 8, 2000. The performances filmed at the Wembley Stadium were later used for the DVD release in 2001 and aired on the CBS Network in the United States. The DVD was certified platinum in the US and UK. The concert at Groningen was filmed and broadcast locally. (Footage is available on YouTube and other websites.)

Personnel 
Production Manager: Jake Berry
Lighting Designer: Roy Bennett
Video Director: Christine Strand
FOH Sound Engineer: Dave Natale
Lighting Director: Jeff Pavey

Band
Drums: Jack Bruno
Piano: Joel Campbell
Supporting vocals: Joel Campbell, Ollie Marland, John Miles, James Ralston
Keyboards: Euge Groove and Ollie Marland
Saxophone and Percussions: Euge Groove
Bass guitar: Warren McRae
Guitar: John Miles and James Ralston
Harmonica: John Miles
Backing vocals: Stacey Campbell, Solange Guenier, Lisa Fischer (EU/NA-II), Gloria Reuben (NA-I) and Claire Louise Turton
Dancers: Stacey Campbell, Solange Guenier, Lisa Fischer (EU/NA-II), Gloria Reuben (NA-I) and Claire Louise Turton, Ivona Brnelić

Notes

References

External links 
Tina Turner | Twenty Four Seven Tour 2000
Twenty Four Seven 2000
Stage Design illustrations 2012 archive

Tina Turner concert tours
2000 concert tours